A right triangle (American English) or right-angled triangle (British), or more formally an orthogonal triangle, formerly called a rectangled triangle, is a triangle in which one angle is a right angle (that is, a 90-degree angle), i.e., in which two sides are perpendicular.  The relation between the sides and other angles of the right triangle is the basis for trigonometry.

The side opposite to the right angle is called the hypotenuse (side c in the figure). The sides adjacent to the right angle are called legs (or catheti, singular: cathetus). Side a may be identified as the side adjacent to angle B and opposed to (or opposite) angle A, while side b is the side adjacent to angle A and opposed to angle B.

If the lengths of all three sides of a right triangle are integers, the triangle is said to be a Pythagorean triangle and its side lengths are collectively known as a Pythagorean triple.

Principal properties

Area
As with any triangle, the area is equal to one half the base multiplied by the corresponding height. In a right triangle, if one leg is taken as the base then the other is height, so the area of a right triangle is one half the product of the two legs. As a formula the area T is

where a and b are the legs of the triangle.

This formula only applies to right triangles.

Altitudes

If an altitude is drawn from the vertex with the right angle to the hypotenuse then the triangle is divided into two smaller triangles which are both similar to the original and therefore similar to each other. From this:
 The altitude to the hypotenuse is the geometric mean (mean proportional) of the two segments of the hypotenuse.
 Each leg of the triangle is the mean proportional of the hypotenuse and the segment of the hypotenuse that is adjacent to the leg.
In equations,
 (this is sometimes known as the right triangle altitude theorem)

where a, b, c, d, e, f are as shown in the diagram. Thus

Moreover, the altitude to the hypotenuse is related to the legs of the right triangle by

For solutions of this equation in integer values of a, b, f, and c, see here.

The altitude from either leg coincides with the other leg. Since these intersect at the right-angled vertex, the right triangle's orthocenter—the intersection of its three altitudes—coincides with the right-angled vertex.

Pythagorean theorem

The Pythagorean theorem states that:
In any right triangle, the area of the square whose side is the hypotenuse (the side opposite the right angle) is equal to the sum of the areas of the squares whose sides are the two legs (the two sides that meet at a right angle).

This can be stated in equation form as

where c is the length of the hypotenuse, and a and b are the lengths of the remaining two sides. Pythagorean triples are integer values of a, b, c satisfying this equation.

Inradius and circumradius
The radius of the incircle of a right triangle with legs a and b and hypotenuse c is

The radius of the circumcircle is half the length of the hypotenuse,

Thus the sum of the circumradius and the inradius is half the sum of the legs:

One of the legs can be expressed in terms of the inradius and the other leg as

Characterizations
A triangle ABC with sides , semiperimeter , area T, altitude h opposite the longest side, circumradius R, inradius r, exradii ra, rb, rc (tangent to a, b, c respectively), and medians ma, mb, mc is a right triangle if and only if any one of the statements in the following six categories is true. Each of them is thus also a property of any right triangle.

Sides and semiperimeter

Angles
 A and B are complementary.

Area
 
 
 
 
  where P is the tangency point of the incircle at the longest side AB.

Inradius and exradii

Altitude and medians

 
 
 The length of one median is equal to the circumradius.
 The shortest altitude (the one from the vertex with the biggest angle) is the geometric mean of the line segments it divides the opposite (longest) side into. This is the right triangle altitude theorem.

Circumcircle and incircle
 The triangle can be inscribed in a semicircle, with one side coinciding with the entirety of the diameter (Thales' theorem).
 The circumcenter is the midpoint of the longest side.
 The longest side is a diameter of the circumcircle 
 The circumcircle is tangent to the nine-point circle.
 The orthocenter lies on the circumcircle.

Trigonometric ratios

The trigonometric functions for acute angles can be defined as ratios of the sides of a right triangle. For a given angle, a right triangle may be constructed with this angle, and the sides labeled opposite, adjacent and hypotenuse with reference to this angle according to the definitions above. These ratios of the sides do not depend on the particular right triangle chosen, but only on the given angle, since all triangles constructed this way are similar. If, for a given angle α, the opposite side, adjacent side and hypotenuse are labeled O, A and H respectively, then the trigonometric functions are

For the expression of hyperbolic functions as ratio of the sides of a right triangle, see the hyperbolic triangle of a hyperbolic sector.

Special right triangles

The values of the trigonometric functions can be evaluated exactly for certain angles using right triangles with special angles. These include the 30-60-90 triangle which can be used to evaluate the trigonometric functions for any multiple of π/6, and the 45-45-90 triangle which can be used to evaluate the trigonometric functions for any multiple of π/4.

Kepler triangle
Let H, G, and A be the harmonic mean, the geometric mean, and the arithmetic mean of two positive numbers a and b with a > b. If a right triangle has legs H and G and hypotenuse A, then

and

where  is the golden ratio  Since the sides of this right triangle are in geometric progression, this is the Kepler triangle.

Thales' theorem

Thales' theorem states that if A is any point of the circle with diameter BC (except B or C themselves) ABC is a right triangle where A is the right angle. The converse states that if a right triangle is inscribed in a circle then the hypotenuse will be a diameter of the circle. A corollary is that the length of the hypotenuse is twice the distance from the right angle vertex to the midpoint of the hypotenuse. Also, the center of the circle that circumscribes a right triangle is the midpoint of the hypotenuse and its radius is one half the length of the hypotenuse.

Medians
The following formulas hold for the medians of a right triangle:

The median on the hypotenuse of a right triangle divides the triangle into two isosceles triangles, because the median equals one-half the hypotenuse.

The medians ma and mb from the legs satisfy

Euler line
In a right triangle, the Euler line contains the median on the hypotenuse—that is, it goes through both the right-angled vertex and the midpoint of the side opposite that vertex. This is because the right triangle's orthocenter, the intersection of its altitudes, falls on the right-angled vertex while its circumcenter, the intersection of its perpendicular bisectors of sides, falls on the midpoint of the hypotenuse.

Inequalities

In any right triangle the diameter of the incircle is less than half the hypotenuse, and more strongly it is less than or equal to the hypotenuse times 

In a right triangle with legs a, b and hypotenuse c,

with equality only in the isosceles case.

If the altitude from the hypotenuse is denoted hc, then

with equality only in the isosceles case.

Other properties
If segments of lengths p and q emanating from vertex C trisect the hypotenuse into segments of length c/3, then

The right triangle is the only triangle having two, rather than one or three, distinct inscribed squares.

Given h > k. Let h and k  be the sides of the two inscribed squares in a right triangle with hypotenuse c. Then

These sides and the incircle radius r are related by a similar formula:

The perimeter of a right triangle equals the sum of the radii of the incircle and the three excircles:

See also
 Acute and obtuse triangles (oblique triangles)
 Spiral of Theodorus

References

External links

 Calculator for right triangles 
 Advanced right triangle calculator

Types of triangles